The Anti-Racist Alliance (ARA) was a British anti-racist organisation formed in November 1991. It was formed mainly by black activists in the Labour Party.

Context and formation
In the early 1990s, the far right, in particular the British National Party (BNP), was resurgent both electorally and in terms of racial attacks (from 4,383 in 1988 to 7,780 three years later). Anti-Fascist Action, the longest established national anti-fascist organisation in the UK at that time, organised well-attended events in October 1991 – a Unity Carnival in east London attracting 10,000 people and a march through Bethnal Green attracting 4,000 people – prompting other left-wing groups to launch anti-racist and anti-fascist organisations, including ARA in November and the re-launch of the Anti-Nazi League (ANL) by the Socialist Workers Party (SWP) two months later.

The ARA was formed by Marc Wadsworth, previously active in Labour Party Black Sections. It was the first black-led, broad-based coalition campaigning to stem the rising tide of racism, antisemitism, and support for the extreme right. The ARA was supported by more than 800 organisations including many national black and Jewish organisations. It also had the support of more than 90 MPs and MEPs from across the political spectrum as well as thousands of individuals. The ARA organised campaigns locally and nationally against racist murders, attacks and harassment and rented offices in Lloyd Baker Street at Clerkenwell, London, from Islington council. It won the support of powerful trade unions such as the Transport and General Workers' Union. Its formation was endorsed by the Jewish Socialist Group, the Indian Workers' Association, and the Black Liaison Group.

Marc Wadsworth spoke with John Ross, among others he had worked with on the left, for Socialist Action's support for the new campaign and Ross suggested appointing the left-wing London Labour MP Ken Livingstone as co-chair of the ARA. Wadsworth proposed Cardinal Basil Hume's race advisor Leela Ramdeen as the other co-chair, to engage black faith groups. A number of Socialist Action members were put on the executive committee because of their campaigning abilities, including Redmond O'Neill and others later appointed advisers to Livingstone when he was Mayor of London. Palma Black was the National Assistant Secretary and full-time officer. Anne Kane of Socialist Action was full-time assistant secretary, but was later fired for gross misconduct. Its vice-chair was Lee Jasper.

The ARA managed to achieve a broad-based coalition of support from across the left, trade unions, and anti-racist organisations, although the anti-fascist magazine Searchlight denounced elements in the ARA leadership [Lee Jasper, its vice-chair] for having links with the antisemite and Nation of Islam leader Louis Farrakhan.

Development and dissolution
Wadsworth and the ARA played a considerable role in the campaign for justice in the wake of the murder of Stephen Lawrence, a black teenager. It organised a peaceful anti-racist demonstration of 3,500 people in central London on 16 October 1993, the same day the ANL organised a rival, larger, and more militant demonstration in Welling, near to the scene of the murder. The rivalry between anti-racist organisations soon alienated the Lawrence family: Doreen Lawrence later wrote that "the various groups that had taken an interest in Stephen's death were tearing each other apart and were in danger of destroying our campaign, which we wanted to keep focused and dignified". Doreen and Neville Lawrence wrote to both the ANL and the ARA to demand that they "stop using Stephen's name".

In 1994 the ARA organised a Trades Union Congress–sponsored "Unite Against Racism" march, attended by 50,000 people.

By 1993 there was considerable tension within the ARA between Wadsworth and Ken Livingstone. On 23 September 1994 the ARA issued a statement claiming that "Ken Livingstone, supported by a faction called Socialist Action and a handful of unprincipled and unrepresentative members of the executive committee, has been waging a relentless campaign to sack [Wadsworth,] the national secretary." On 30 September 1994 Livingstone went to the High Court to determine voting rights for the delegates to the ARA's forthcoming annual meeting and an out-of-court settlement was reached. In October 1994 both Livingstone and Wadsworth stepped down. Wadsworth gave way to Kumar Murshid, a future Livingstone mayoral adviser on race. Murshid walked away from the job after turning up at the ARA's offices to find that Wadsworth's staff had changed the locks for security reasons. The ARA collapsed rapidly after unions, including the Transport and General Workers' Union, withdrew support.

By February 1995 the breakaway National Assembly Against Racism (NAAR), had been established, largely by three members of Socialist Action, O'Neill, Jude Woodward, and Anne Kane. Lee Jasper, who became Livingstone's senior mayoral policy adviser on equalities, was its first secretary.

Approach
The ARA claimed to be the only black-led anti-racist movement in the UK. It argued that black self-organisation and labour movement support were the key factors in combating racism in the UK. Its strategy was to focus on making a case for more robust legislation against racial harassment and racist literature. In this approach it contrasted with its main rival, the ANL, which prioritised the fight against fascism rather than state racism.

References

Footnotes

Bibliography

External links
 George Padmore Institute Archive holdings for European Action for Racial Equality

Anti-racist organisations in the United Kingdom
Anti-fascist organisations in the United Kingdom